4 Runner is the self-titled debut studio album by American country music group 4 Runner, released on May 9, 1995 on the Nashville division of Polydor Records. It produced the singles "Cain's Blood", "A Heart with 4 Wheel Drive", "Home Alone", and "Ripples", all of which charted on the Billboard Hot Country Singles & Tracks (now Hot Country Songs charts. Of these four singles, "Cain's Blood" was the only one to chart within the Top 40, peaking at #26.

Critical reception
Brian Wahlert of Country Standard Time criticized some of the songs on 4 Runner for "cop[ying] the worst pop elements" of The Oak Ridge Boys, but said that the presence of bass singer Jim Chapman gave the material a "fresh sound." His review praised "Cain's Blood" and "A Heart with 4 Wheel Drive" as the strongest tracks. Entertainment Weekly critic Alanna Nash gave the album a B-minus rating. In her review, she said that "they can be as hokey as the Oaks, but unlike the Statlers, they're sentimental without being mawkish."

Track listing

Personnel

4 Runner
Jim Chapman – bass vocals
Billy Crittenden – baritone vocals
Lee Hilliard – tenor vocals
Craig Morris – lead vocals

Additional musicians
Glen Duncan – fiddle
Larry Franklin – fiddle
Sonny Garrish – Dobro, steel guitar
Tony Haselden – acoustic guitar
John Hobbs – piano
Mike Lawler – synthesizer
Paul Leim – drums
Brent Mason – electric guitar
Terry McMillan – harmonica
Steve Nathan – organ, piano, synthesizer
Danny Parks – acoustic guitar
Larry Paxton – bass guitar
Don Potter – acoustic guitar
Matt Rollings – piano
Reggie Young – electric guitar

All strings performed by the Nashville String Machine under the conduction of Carl Gorodetzky.

Chart performance

References

1995 debut albums
4 Runner albums
Albums produced by Buddy Cannon
Polydor Records albums